Phil McGuinness (born 30 May 1971) is a former award-winning Australian rules footballer who played for Glenelg and Port Adelaide in the South Australian National Football League (SANFL).

He began his career at Glenelg in 1991 and switched to Port Adelaide in 1996. McGuinness was quite successful in that club's Best and Fairest, being runner-up in 1999 and then in 2000 winning the award.

He is the brother of former Adelaide Crows captain Tony McGuinness.

References

Glenelg Football Club players
Port Adelaide Football Club (SANFL) players
Port Adelaide Football Club players (all competitions)
1971 births
Living people
Australian rules footballers from South Australia